Muhammed Metha (born 5 September 1945) is an Indian poet and songwriter.  He was born in Theni in 1945. He  popularised modern poetry (Pudukavithai) in the 1970s and has written more than 30 books, including novels, short stories and essays. His awards include the Bharathidasan Award from the state government of Tamil Nadu. He is also credited with 400 songs for films.
Poet Mu.Metha participated in the "vanampaadi" literary movement. That movement aimed at writing poems in the view of Marxism and world wide vision.

Metha was a professor of tamil for 35 years at Presidency College, Chennai.Member of legislative assembly in 1967 under C.N. Annadurai leadership from periyakulam constituency.

Published works 

 Kaneerpookal (1974)
 Oorvalam (1977)
 Manacharagu (1978)
 Avargalvarukirarkal (1980)
 Mughathukku Mugham (1981)
 Nadantha Nadagangal (1982)
 Kathiiruntha Katru (1982)
 Oru Vaanam Iru Siragu (1983)
 Thiruvizhavil Therupadagan (1984)
 Nandavana Natkal (1985)
 Idhayathil Natkali (1985)
 Ennudaya Pothimarangal (1987)
 Kanavukkuthiraigal (1992)
 Kamban Kaviarangil (1993)
 En Pillai Tamil (1994)
 Ottrai Thikkuchi (1997)
 Manithanai Thedi (1998)
 Agahyathukkuadutha Veedu (2004)
 Mu.Metha Kavithaigal (2007)
 Kalaigarukku Tamil Endru Pear(2010)
 Kanavukalin Kaiezhuthu (2016)

Filmography

Lyricist

Writer & producer 
Thendral Varum Theru (1994)

See also 
 Modern Tamil literature

References 
 Syed Muthahar Saqaf, Modern poetry brought life to the lifeless, The Hindu, Sept 3, 2006

1945 births
Living people
Tamil poets
Tamil film poets
Indian lyricists
Indian male singer-songwriters
Indian singer-songwriters
Indian Marxist writers
Indian Muslims
20th-century Indian poets
20th-century Indian singers
20th-century Indian male writers
20th-century Indian male singers
Poets from Tamil Nadu
Singers from Tamil Nadu
Musicians from Madurai
Writers from Madurai
Academic staff of Presidency College, Chennai
Recipients of the Sahitya Akademi Award in Tamil